Frances Willard House may refer to:

Frances Willard House (Evanston, Illinois), a U.S. National Historic Landmark in Cook County, Illinois
Frances Willard House (Chattanooga, Tennessee), listed on the National Register of Historic Places in Hamilton County, Tennessee

See also
Frances Willard Schoolhouse, Janesville, Wisconsin, listed on the NRHP in Wisconsin